Vespasia Polla (also known as Vespasia Pollia, born c. 15 BC,  fl 1st century AD) was the mother of the Roman emperor Vespasian, and grandmother to the emperors Titus and Domitian. Polla came from an equestrian family at Nursia.

Suetonius identifies her father as the Vespasius Pollio who was a three-time military tribune and a praefectus castrorum. Her brother rose as high as the praetorship. The Vespasii were regarded as an old family of great renown, and Suetonius notes a site called Vespasiae where many of their monuments had been built. This site was located on a mountaintop near the sixth milestone on the road between Nursia and Spoletum (present-day Spoleto).

Vespasia married a tax collector Titus Flavius Sabinus, and survived him. Their daughter Flavia Vespasia died in her infancy. One son, also named Titus Flavius Sabinus, served as consul in 47. After her husband died she never remarried.

Sabinus achieved the senatorial rank, but Vespasian put off doing so. Suetonius (Life of Vespasian, 2.2) states that:

Flavian family tree

References

Flavian dynasty